"Ubirajara" ("lord of the spear") is an informal genus of compsognathid theropod that lived during the early Cretaceous period in what is now Brazil. The manuscript describing it has never been published and, as a consequence, both genus and species name are considered invalid and unavailable. It is known by a single species, "Ubirajara jubatus", recovered from the Crato Formation. It was described as the first Gondwanan non-avian theropod dinosaur discovered with preserved integumentary structures. Such proto-feathers, most likely used for display, include slender monofilaments associated with the base of the neck, increasing in length along the dorsal thoracic region, where they would form a mane, as well as a pair of elongate, ribbon-like structures likely emerging from its shoulders. The taxon was informally named in 2020 in a now-withdrawn in-press academic paper. The description caused controversy due to the fossil having been apparently illegally smuggled from Brazil. In July 2022, Germany agreed to return the fossil to Brazil after a legitimate export permit could not be found. The name "Ubirajara jubatus" was removed from Zoobank in November 2022, which means it no longer has any nomenclatural significance.

History of discovery
Workers recovered a number of fossils from a chalk quarry located between Nova Olinda and Santana do Cariri. One of the recovered pieces was a chalk plate that had already been split by the workers. Further preparation by a sharp steel pin and X-ray photography revealed the presence of a small theropod skeleton. The specimen, SMNK PAL 29241, was discovered in a layer of the Crato Formation, dating from the Aptian, about 115 million years old. It consists of a partial skeleton lacking the skull, preserved on a slab and counterslab. It consists of nine neck vertebrae, thirteen back vertebrae, two sacral vertebrae, the shoulder girdle, one neck rib, seven dorsal ribs, fifteen belly ribs and the almost complete left arm. Apart from the bones, the fossil also preserves remains of the plumage, skin, granulate structures in the torso, and the keratin sheaths of the hand claws. The skeleton is partially articulated. It represents a juvenile, and possibly male, individual.

The genus name "Ubirajara" was erected by Robert S. H. Smyth, David Michael Martill, Eberhard Frey, Hector Eduardo Rivera-Silva and Norbert Lenz in December 2020. The generic name means "Lord of the Spear" in the local Tupi language, in reference to the elongate shoulder filaments. The informal specific name, "jubatus," means "maned" in Latin, referring to the preserved integument on its back. However, with the paper's retraction in 2021, the name "Ubirajara jubatus" became unavailable.

Controversy

The fossil was acquired in 1995 by the State Museum of Natural History Karlsruhe (SMNK) and moved to Germany after an export permit was allegedly obtained. The fossils have been alleged to have been illegally imported into Germany out of Brazil in 1995, as Brazilian laws do not allow the removal of fossils from its territory, nor for studies on them to be conducted without the participation of at least one Brazilian scientist. As a result, Brazilian scientists are campaigning for the repatriation of the fossils.

Due to the ethical issues involving the potentially illegal transfer of the fossil from Brazil to Germany, the paper describing the specimen was "temporarily removed" only a few days after being made available online "in press" prior to formal publication. The article was later withdrawn in September 2021.
The case has been labeled as an instance of scientific colonialism.

In July 2022, following an extensive social media campaign, the SMNK agreed to return the specimen to Brazil after their investigation failed to find legitimate export permits.

On 18 November 2022, the records of the names "Ubirajara jubatus", as well as their publication records, were removed from Zoobank, and a 2023 review noted that "Ubirajara jubatus" is an unavailable name with no nomenclatural significance, but not specifically a nomen nudum.

Description

The describing authors established a unique combination of two traits that in themselves were not unique. The shoulder blade has 81% of the length of the humerus instead of being equally long or much longer, the two prevailing conditions with other compsognathids. The top profiles of the neural spines of the sacral vertebrae are 15% to 27% longer than their bases are long in side view, instead of being much longer as with Mirischia.

The granulated structures in the torso were concluded to have been adipocere, corpse wax. They do not show food remains and are therefore unlikely to represent intestines. Also they lack a scale structure. The specimen preserves a "mane" of proto-feathers that ran along its neck and back. Also they covered the arm including the hand up to the claws. This SMF (slender monofilamentous integument) became longer towards the rear, reaching a length of eleven centimetres over the ninth and tenth back vertebrae. These filaments were not branched and had a diameter of about 0.3 millimetre with a hollow core. Skin remains contain a series of nineteen rectangular vertical structures that were interpreted as the follicles of the filaments. Skin muscles would have allowed to erect a mane over the back. Their shrinking in the saline lagoon conditions of the Crato Formation would have caused the mane to have been activated after death, as still shown by the fossil.

Unique,  integumentary structures projected from its sides. The left side shows a pair of flat straight elongated spikes. A similar pair was assumed to have been present on the opposite right side. The upper spike is fifteen centimetres long, the lower one fourteen centimetres. The structures are reinforced by a central sharp longitudinal ridge, 0.1 millimetre wide. Total width is 4.5 millimetres for the upper spike, 2.5 millimetres for the lower with parallel sides which only taper close to the distal end. There is no sign of any ossification. The authors compared this Broad Monofilamentous Integument to those of the standardwing bird-of-paradise. The authors speculate that the ribbon-like shoulder structures might have had display purposes, perhaps being erected in a courtship display. It was also deemed possible that they vibrated and even made a noise. That such a display structure should be present in a juvenile is exceptional. This phenomenon is not known from modern Neornithes but has been reported in Enantiornithes and Zuolong. The authors noted that in the more derived group of the Paraves, such structures are largely limited to the tail. They suggested this prevented the display structures to limit the aerodynamic capabilities of these volant species. The non-volant compsognathids would in this respect not be hindered by shoulder spikes. That simple filaments could evolve into complex display structures would be an indication that pennaceous feathers were not evolved for display reasons, contrary to what has been often assumed.

Phylogeny
The holotype was placed in the Compsognathidae family in 2020, as the sister species of a clade formed by Sinosauropteryx and Compsognathus.

See also 
List of informally named dinosaurs
List of non-avian dinosaur species preserved with evidence of feathers

References 

Early Cretaceous dinosaurs of South America
Compsognathids
Albian life
Cretaceous Brazil
Fossils of Brazil
Crato Formation
Nomina nuda